The 1940 Rollins Tars football team represented Rollins College during the 1940 college football season, and won the Southern Intercollegiate Athletic Association (SIAA) title. The Tars were disappointed the Florida Gators did not meet a challenge for a state championship.

Schedule

Players

References

Rollins
Rollins Tars football seasons
Rollins Tars football